Ribeira da Trindade is a stream in the southern part of the island of Santiago in Cape Verde. It is the most important river of Praia, the capital of Cape Verde. The stream flows northwest to southeast and is about 15 km in length. Its source is in the municipality of São Domingos, near the settlement  Achada Mitra. It flows through the city of Praia and discharges into the Praia Harbour, near the city centre.

See also
List of streams in Cape Verde

References

Rivers of Cape Verde
São Domingos Municipality, Cape Verde
Praia
Geography of Santiago, Cape Verde